The vættir (singular vættr ) are spirits in Norse mythology. The term can be used to refer to the full cosmos of supernatural beings, including the álfar (elves), dvergar (dwarves), jötnar (giants), and gods (the Æsir and Vanir). Vættir can also refer more specifically to landvættir (nature spirits), fjallvættir (mountain spirits), sjóvættir (sea spirits), skogvættir (forest spirits), vatnavættir (guardians of the specific waters), or húsvættir (house spirits).

Etymology
The Old Norse term véttr , / vættr and its English cognate wight are descended from Proto-Germanic *wihtiz (thing, creature), from  Proto-Indo-European *wekti- ("object, thing"). Vættr and wight normally refer to a supernatural being, especially landvættr (land spirit), but can refer to any creature. The Norwegian vette is used much in the same way as the Old Norse vættr as are the corresponding Swedish cognate vätte (dialect form vätter – Old Swedish vætter) and the Danish vætte. A related form in the Slavic languages can be seen in Old Church Slavonic вєшть, (veštĭ), meaning thing, matter, or subject.

Viking Age
Landvættir (nature spirits) are chthonic guardians of specific grounds, such as wild places or farms. When Vikings approached land, they reportedly removed their carved dragon heads from the bows of their longships so as not to frighten and thus provoke the landvættir to attack and thereby incur bad luck from them. Icelandic culture continues to celebrate the supernatural protection over the island and four landvættr can still be seen in the Icelandic coat-of-arms: a troll-bull, troll-eagle, dragon, and handsome giant. The troll-animals are actually jötunn who shape shifted into the form (and mentality) of an animal and such animals are supernaturally strong.

Folklore
Húsvættir is a collective term for keepers of the household, like the Scottish brownie, or the Nordic tomte (also referred to as Nisse). The tomte or nisse is a solitary vätte, living on the farmstead. He is usually benevolent and helpful, which can not be said about an innately mischievous illvätte. However, a nisse can cause a lot of damage if he is displeased or angry, including killing of livestock or causing serious accidents.

Scandinavian folklore features a class of beings similar to the Old Norse landvættir. They are known by many names, although the most common are vättar in southern Sweden (singular: vätte), vittra in northern Sweden, and huldrefolk in Norway (although the singular vittra and huldra, respectively, refer to a solitary and quite different being).

During the 19th century, Peter Christen Asbjørnsen and Jørgen Moe compiled Norwegian folk tales. These stories often reflected the animistic folk belief that preserved earlier elements derived from the Viking Age but was strongly influenced by medieval Biblical cosmology. Prominent are stories that reflect later views of the vættir, usually called the huldrefolk (from Old Norse huldufólk), meaning "concealed people" and referring to their other worldliness or their power of invisibility.

The English surname Wightman retains the meaning of the word "wight" and could be translated as "elf-friend".

See also
 Rå, spirits that protect natural features in later Scandinavian folklore

Citations

General and cited sources 
Reidar Th. Christiansen  (1964) Folktales of Norway  (University of Chicago Press) 
Reimund Kvideland & Henning K. Sehmsdorf  (1988) Scandinavian Folk Belief and Legend  (University  of Minnesota Press)

Further reading 
Norske Folke-Eventyr (Norwegian Folktales), by Peter Christen Asbjørnsen & Jørgen Engebretsen Moe, 1843, 1844, 1871, 1876.

External links
 Scandinavian Folklore, compiled by Scott Trimble – a scholarly outline of prominent themes in Scandinavian folklore.

Germanic mythology
Nature spirits
Scandinavian legendary creatures
Tutelary deities

da:Vætte